Ferdinand Alfred Sinaga (born 18 September 1988) is an Indonesian professional footballer who plays as a forward for Liga 1 club Persis Solo. Ferdinand plays mainly as a striker, but he has also been deployed as a second striker, and wide forward.

Club career

Persib Bandung
In March 2014, Sinaga was banned for two matches by the Football Association of Indonesia for excessively cursing at a referee in a match against Semen Padang on 16 February 2014. He missed Persib's next matches against PS Barito Putera and Arema Cronus. In addition to the ban, he was also fined 25 million rupiahs for his behavior.

On 10 June 2014, Sinaga scored a spectacular bicycle kick in a 3–1 win over PS Barito Putera. He juggled the ball twice from a corner kick before unleashing an unstoppable overhead kick into the net.

Sinaga played in the 2014 Indonesia Super League Final against Persipura Jayapura. Although he did not manage to score in normal time, Sinaga netted the second penalty for Persib in the 5–3 penalty shootout win.

Sriwijaya
On 30 November 2014, he was signed by Sriwijaya. Sinaga made his debut on 4 April 2015 in a match against Pelita Bandung Raya. On 7 April 2015, Sinaga scored his first goal for Sriwijaya in the 76th minute against Semen Padang at the Gelora Sriwijaya Stadium, Palembang.

PSM Makassar
He was signed for PSM Makassar to play in Indonesia Soccer Championship A in the 2016 season and 2017 Liga 1. He made 51 league appearances and scored 22 goals.

Kelantan
On 4 January 2018, Sinaga signed a one-year contract with Malaysian Malaysia Super League side Kelantan. He made his league debut for Kelantan FA in 2–1 defeat to Melaka United on 3 February 2018. On 19 March 2018, Sinaga has been released from Kelantan and returned to Indonesian club PSM Makassar.

Return to PSM Makassar
In 2018, it was confirmed that Ferdinand Sinaga would re-join PSM Makassar, signing a three-year contract. Sinaga made his debut on 31 March 2018 in a match against Perseru Serui. On 16 April 2018, Sinaga scored his first goal for PSM in the 28th minute against Barito Putera. He made 62 league appearances and scored 20 goals for PSM Makassar.

PSMS Medan (loan)
He was signed for PSMS Medan to play in the Liga 2 in the 2020 season, on loan from PSM Makassar. This season was suspended on 27 March 2020 due to the COVID-19 pandemic. The season was abandoned and was declared void on 20 January 2021.

Return to Persib Bandung
In 2021, Ferdinand Sinaga signed a contract with Indonesian Liga 1 club Persib Bandung for 2021 Menpora Cup.

Persis Solo
In 2021, Ferdinand signed a contract with Indonesian Liga 2 club Persis Solo. He was transferred from Persib Bandung. He made his league debut on 5 October against Persijap Jepara at the Manahan Stadium, Surakarta. On 22 December 2021, Ferdinand scored his first goal for Persis against Persiba Balikpapan at the Pakansari Stadium, Cibinong.

PSM Makassar (loan)
In 2022, Ferdinand signed a contract with Indonesian Liga 1 club PSM Makassar, on loan from Persis Solo. He made his league debut on 8 January 2022 in a match against Madura United at the Ngurah Rai Stadium, Denpasar.

International career
Sinaga has played for Indonesia at youth and senior level. Sinaga has played in 2011 Southeast Asian Games where his side lost with a penalty kick against Malaysia in the final. Sinaga also has represented Indonesia U-23 at 2014 Asian Games in South Korea. He has scored 6 goals during that tournament.

Sinaga was first capped for senior team on 27 August 2011 in a 0–1 friendly defeat against Jordan at the Amman International Stadium, Amman coming off the bench for Cristian Gonzáles.

Personal life
Sinaga is a devout Catholic who often celebrates goals by making the sign of the cross. Sinaga was born to Samson Sinaga, a bus driver, and Risnalu Turnip. He is married to Aghie Veronicca and they have two children named Fabio and Fabian Sinaga. Sinaga has more than eleven tattoos on his body, mostly on his arm and torso. Among his tattoos are the name of his wife and child, Catholic prayers, Virgin Mary and a Christian cross.

Career statistics

Club

International

Indonesia U-23

Honours

Club
Pelita Jaya U-21
 Indonesia Super League U-21: 2008-09
Semen Padang
 Indonesia Premier League: 2011-12

Persib Bandung
 Indonesia Super League: 2014

PSM Makassar
 Piala Indonesia: 2019

Persis Solo
 Liga 2: 2021

International
Indonesia U-23
 Southeast Asian Games  Silver medal: 2011
Indonesia
 AFF Championship runner-up: 2016

Individual
 Indonesian Premier League Top Goalscorer: 2011-12 (15 goals)
 Asian Games Top Goalscorer: 2014 (6 goals)
 Indonesia Super League Best Player: 2014

References

External links
 

Indonesian footballers
Living people
1988 births
People of Batak descent
People from Bengkulu
Indonesian Roman Catholics
Indonesia international footballers
Expatriate footballers in Malaysia
Indonesian expatriate footballers
Indonesian expatriate sportspeople in Malaysia
Indonesia youth international footballers
Indonesian Super League-winning players
Persibat Batang players
Persikab Bandung players
Pelita Jaya FC players
PPSM Magelang players
Persiwa Wamena players
Semen Padang F.C. players
Persisam Putra Samarinda players
Persib Bandung players
Sriwijaya F.C. players
PSM Makassar players
Kelantan F.C. players
PSMS Medan players
Persis Solo players
Indonesian Premier Division players
Malaysia Super League players
Liga 1 (Indonesia) players
Liga 2 (Indonesia) players
Indonesian Premier League players
Footballers at the 2014 Asian Games
Association football wingers
Association football forwards
Southeast Asian Games silver medalists for Indonesia
Southeast Asian Games medalists in football
Competitors at the 2011 Southeast Asian Games
Asian Games competitors for Indonesia